The Wheeler-Magnus Round Barn is located on the grounds of a retirement community in the Cook County village of Arlington Heights in the U.S. state of Illinois.  It is a  diameter barn built in approximately 1910.

It was listed on the National Register of Historic Places in 1992 when it joined the Round Barns in Illinois Multiple Property Submission (MPS). It is the only round barn in Cook County listed on the Register.

References

Arlington Heights, Illinois
Barns on the National Register of Historic Places in Illinois
Buildings and structures on the National Register of Historic Places in Cook County, Illinois
Round barns in Illinois